Narhire Kalpana Ramesh (born 25 October 1969) is a Shiv Sena politician from Osmanabad district. She was a member of the 14th Lok Sabha of India representing Osmanabad constituency of Maharashtra.

Positions held
 1995: Re-elected to Maharashtra Legislative Assembly (1st term) 
 1999: Re-elected to Maharashtra Legislative Assembly (2nd term)
 2004: Elected to 14th Lok Sabha

References

External links
 Shiv Sena Home Page
 Official biographical sketch in Parliament of India website

Living people
1969 births
Maharashtra MLAs 1995–1999
Maharashtra MLAs 1999–2004
India MPs 2004–2009
Marathi politicians
People from Osmanabad
Women members of the Maharashtra Legislative Assembly
Shiv Sena politicians
People from Marathwada
Lok Sabha members from Maharashtra
21st-century Indian women politicians
21st-century Indian politicians
Women members of the Lok Sabha
20th-century Indian women
20th-century Indian people